Nefteyugansky District is an administrative and municipal district (raion), one of the nine in Khanty-Mansi Autonomous Okrug, Russia. It is located in the south of the autonomous okrug. Its administrative center is the city of Nefteyugansk (which is not administratively a part of the district). Population: 44,815 (2010 Census);

Administrative and municipal status
Within the framework of administrative divisions, Nefteyugansky District is one of the nine in the autonomous okrug. The city of Nefteyugansk serves as its administrative center, despite being incorporated separately as a city of okrug significance—an administrative unit with the status equal to that of the districts.

As a municipal division, the district is incorporated as Nefteyugansky Municipal District. The city of okrug significance of Nefteyugansk is incorporated separately from the district as Nefteyugansk Urban Okrug.

References

Notes

Sources

Districts of Khanty-Mansi Autonomous Okrug
